Angels Exodus is the third studio album by American rapper Lil B. It was released digitally on January 18, 2011 through BasedWorld Records and Amalgam Digital. It serves as a prelude to Lil B's 2012 mixtape, Glassface.

Music and lyrics
Angels Exodus is based on a loose theme of "Lil B against the undead: zombies and vampires." The first track "Exhibit 6" features "a shout out to Jay Electronica and rhyming over a slow-paced, dark instrumental." The track "Motivation", which features a Tim Hecker sample in the background, is about "Lil B looking back on when people were criticizing him, and observing how now they’re all 'on his dick'." "Cold War, Pt. 2" features a sample from Janelle Monáe's "Cold War." The track "More Silence More Coffins" features a sample from Evanescence's "Bring Me to Life."

Critical reception

The album generally received mixed-to-positive reviews from music critics. Fact magazine critic Chris Campbell stated: "Angels Exodus gives Lil B the chance to indulge his significant conceptual side with some confines" and further wrote: "The only fair way to evaluate a Lil B album is against other Lil B albums/mixtapes, and in terms of quality, he’s certainly released better." Amanda Bassa of HipHopDX wrote: "In some ways, Angels Exodus is impressive for the sheer fact that Lil B seems to have shown some sort of artistic and mental growth since his initial YouTube blitz." Nevertheless, Bassa also criticized the album, stating: "Even mass amounts of hype can’t cover up Lil B’s poorly mixed vocals, off-kilter methods of blending rapping with simply speaking, skewed perspective on life, and utter knack for taking what makes Rap great, and doing the exact opposite."

Track listing

Personnel
Lil B —  vocals, lyrics
Bobby Music — production
Vanx — production
Clams Casino — production 
Lou Pocus — production

References

External links
 

2011 albums
Lil B albums
Amalgam Digital albums
Zombies and revenants in popular culture